Aleksandr Nikolayevich Gunyashev (born 22 December 1959) is a retired Russian super-heavyweight weightlifter. He won the European title in 1985, placing second at the world championships the same year. In 1983–1984 he set six world records: four in the snatch and two in the total. His younger brother Sergey won a bronze medal at the 1991 European Championships in the super-heavyweight division.

References

1959 births
People from Ozyorsk, Chelyabinsk Oblast
Living people
Soviet male weightlifters
World Weightlifting Championships medalists
European champions in weightlifting
European Weightlifting Championships medalists